Martin Madidi Fayulu (born 21 November 1956) is a businessman and lawmaker in the Democratic Republic of the Congo. He is the leader of the Engagement for Citizenship and Development party. On 11 November 2018, he was chosen by seven opposition leaders to be their joint presidential candidate in the 2018 Democratic Republic of the Congo general election. However, within 24 hours, Félix Antoine Tshisekedi Tshilombo, the eventual official, but widely viewed as fraudulent, winner of the 2018 presidential election, and Vital Kamerhe, the other opposition candidate, rescinded their endorsement of his candidacy and formed their own pact with Tshisekedi as candidate.

Biography

Born in Kinshasa, then Léopoldville, Martin Fayulu is a former ExxonMobil executive, having worked with the oil company from 1984 until 2003. He served as the company's director-general in Ethiopia as his last post. His involvement in politics began in 1991 when he attended the Sovereign National Conference, which brought together delegates from different regions and organizations to campaign for a multi-party democracy. Mobutu Sese Seko, the totalitarian President of Zaire (as the Democratic Republic of the Congo was then called), allowed the conference to take place but rejected its conclusions. Fayulu did not enter politics full time until 2006, after Mobutu and his dictatorship were gone. In the 2006 and 2011 general elections, he was elected as an MP to the National Assembly. In 2009 he established the Commitment for Citizenship and Development party, which has three MPs, including Fayulu.

Félix Tshisekedi was declared the winner of the December 2018 election, despite election observers' belief that Fayulu had won the vote, in what was seen by Fayulu and his supporters as a deal between Tshisekedi and outgoing President Joseph Kabila.  Fayulu challenged the result in the DRC's Constitutional Court, which has been criticised for being staffed primarily by Kabila appointees, and thus by late January 2019 the court ruled that Tshisekedi was the rightful winner and he was sworn in as President. He has continued to remain active in politics since the election, continuing to claim that he was the rightful winner. In late July 2019, he met in Lubumbashi with members of the opposition, including former Katanga Province governor Moïse Katumbi, former Prime Minister Adolphe Muzito, and a representative of former rebel leader Jean-Pierre Bemba. They discussed the future of the opposition and democracy in the DRC.

References

External links
 

1956 births
Candidates for President of the Democratic Republic of the Congo
Democratic Republic of the Congo businesspeople
ExxonMobil people
Living people
Members of the National Assembly (Democratic Republic of the Congo)
People from Kinshasa